The 15667/15668 Gandhidham–Kamakhya Express is an Express train of the Indian Railways connecting  in Gujarat and   in Assam. It is currently operated with 15667/15668 train numbers on a weekly basis.

Service
 The 15667/Gandhidham–Kamakhya Express has an average speed of 48 km/hr and covers 3118 km in 64 hrs 30 mins.
 The 15668/Kamakhya–Gandhidham Express has an average speed of 49 km/hr and covers 3118 km in 63 hrs 40 mins.

Route and halts 
The important halts of the train are:

GUJARAT
  (Starts)
 
 
 
 
 
 

MADHYA PRADESH
 

RAJASTHAN
 
 

UTTAR PRADESH
 
 
 
 
 
 
 Pt. Deen Dayal Upadhyaya Junction

BIHAR
 
 
 

WEST BENGAL
 New Jalpaiguri (Siliguri)
 
 

ASSAM
 
 
 Goalpara
  (Ends)

Coach composition
The train consists of 21 coaches:
 1 AC II Tier
 4 AC III Tier
 10 Sleeper coaches
 3 General Unreserved
 2 End-on generator
 1 Pantry car

Direction reversal
The train reverses its direction once at

Traction
As the route is yet to be fully electrified, it is hauled by a Sabarmati Diesel Loco Shed-based WDP-4D from Gandhidham to Ahmedabad handing over to Vadodara Electric Loco Shed-based WAP-7 locomotive which takes the train to upto New Cooch Behar where Siliguri Diesel Loco Shed-based WDP-4D completes the remainder of the journey to Kamakhya Junction.

See also 
 Ahmedabad–Patna Weekly Express
 Dwarka Express
 Sabarmati Express

References

External links 
15667/Gandhidham–Kamakhya Express India Rail Info
15668/Kamakhya–Gandhidham Express India Rail Info

Transport in Gandhidham
Transport in Guwahati
Rail transport in Gujarat
Rail transport in Madhya Pradesh
Rail transport in Uttar Pradesh
Rail transport in Bihar
Rail transport in West Bengal
Rail transport in Assam
Express trains in India